Marie Trintignant (21 January 1962 – 1 August 2003) was a French film and stage actress. She appeared in over 30 movies during the span of her 36-year career. Her family was deeply involved in France's film industry, as her father was an actor and her mother was a director, producer, and screenwriter.

In 2003, Trintignant began an affair with Bertrand Cantat, the lead singer of French rock band Noir Désir. That same year, Cantat, Trintignant, and Trintignant's mother traveled to Lithuania so Trintignant and her mother could finish work on a television movie. On 26 July 2003, while in their shared hotel room, Cantat flew into a jealous rage during an argument over a text message sent to Trintignant by her husband, from whom she was separated; Cantat proceeded to beat Trintignant severely about the head and face. She died days later from cerebral edema brought about by her injuries. Cantat was convicted of "murder with indirect intent" in her death and received an eight-year prison sentence, of which he served four before his early release. Trintignant's case became a cause célèbre in the discussion of domestic violence and leniency towards perpetrators.

Early life
Trintignant was born in Boulogne-Billancourt, the daughter of actor Jean-Louis Trintignant and his second wife, French film director, producer, and screenwriter Nadine Marquand.  When Marie's baby sister Pauline died when Marie was nine, she became withdrawn and virtually stopped speaking. Her parents divorced in 1976. Throughout her early life, she was afflicted by severe shyness, but by her mid-teens, she decided to commit to acting. She had a strong affection for animals and considered becoming a veterinarian, but in the end pursued a career in acting.

Career 
She first appeared on screen aged four in My Love, My Love, which was directed by her mother and starred her father. Trintignant's first film to generate significant critical acclaim was Série noire, in which she starred alongside Patrick Dewaere.

In 1988, Trintignant worked under French director Claude Chabrol in the film Une Affaire de Femme, in which she played a young prostitute in wartime Vichy France. Of the role and Chabrol's impact on her career, Trintignant later reflected, "Until then, I had always felt that I was a fraud if I did not go to extremes in showing my characters' pain, but he taught me lightness. He showed me how to grow without false tragedy." She worked with Chabrol again in 1991 on the film Betty, an adaptation of a book by Georges Simenon.

In 1990, Trintignant was involved in a serious car accident which she narrowly survived. The accident hardly impacted the pace of her career, and she starred in 21 films afterwards, including Les Amants du Pont-Neuf in 1991 and Wild Target in 1993, starring alongside Jean Rochefort and Guillaume Depardieu. She starred opposite her then-husband François Cluzet in the 1995 film The Apprentices, and in 1998, she appeared again with Depardieu in White Lies. Two of Trintignant's films were released posthumously: Janis et John, a biographical film directed by her estranged husband Samuel Benchetrit, in which Trintignant starred as Janis Joplin, and Colette, une femme libre, a biographical miniseries in which Trintignant played the lead role of French novelist Colette.

Trintignant stated that she enjoyed portraying marginalized women and tragic heroes on film; she enjoyed playing characters who allowed her to speak "for those who don't deserve being spoken for." She performed in both comedies and tragedies.

Personal life
Trintignant was the mother of four sons:

 Roman, with drummer 
 Paul, with actor and former husband François Cluzet
 Léon, with Mathias Othnin-Girard
 Jules, with her husband director Samuel Benchetrit

Trintignant was still married to Benchetrit at the time of her death, although the two had separated earlier in 2003.

Death

In 2003, Trintignant traveled to Vilnius, Lithuania, with her mother and her boyfriend, Bertrand Cantat, so she and her mother could finish work on Colette, une femme libre, a television movie in which Trintignant played the starring role. On 26 July, Trintignant was in a hotel room in Vilnius when, according to Cantat, Trintignant received a text from her husband. The text caused Cantat to fly into a jealous rage, and he beat Trintignant severely. Seven hours later, Trintignant's brother summoned emergency services to check the hotel room. When they arrived, Trintignant had slipped into a deep coma. She was transported to a hospital in Vilnius the next day; later, she was moved to the Hartmann Clinic, a hospital in Neuilly-sur-Seine, as her mother stated, "If she is to die, I want her to die in France." Trintignant died in Neuilly from swelling of the brain at the age of 41 on 1 August 2003.

Aftermath 

When authorities first arrived at the hotel room, Cantat told them and Trintignant's parents that Trintignant had fallen backwards during their argument and hit her head against a wall. An autopsy revealed that Cantat actually struck Trintignant in the head and face at least 19 times. After the autopsy countered Cantat's version of events, Cantat would only admit to having "slapped" Trintignant four times and then putting her to bed while not knowing that she had incurred severe and irreversible brain damage due to the assault.

Although Cantat attempted to argue in court that he should be convicted of manslaughter, he was convicted of the slightly more severe "murder with indirect intent" and sentenced to eight years in prison. At the request of his lawyers, Cantat was moved from the Lithuanian Lukiškės prison, to a prison near Muret, France, in September 2004.
He was released on parole after serving four years of his sentence. Cantat's parole drew widespread criticism from women's rights activists and Trintignant's parents, who had failed to persuade French President Nicolas Sarkozy and French judges to block Cantat's conditional release.

Several writers criticized the media for sensationalizing Trintignant's death and her relationship with Cantat, as, despite the elements of domestic violence in their relationship, rock journalists frequently compared them to Romeo and Juliet, as well as Sid Vicious and Nancy Spungen.

Trintignant's death resurfaced in the media years after Cantat's release when, in 2010, Cantat's ex-wife Krisztina Rády died by suicide. Cantat was present at Rády's house at the time of her death. Before her death, Rády had complained that Cantat subjected her to physical and mental abuse. Magistrates in Bordeaux conducted an investigation against Cantat to adjudge if he should be charged for culpability in Rády's death, but ultimately, they decided against pressing charges.

Marie Trintignant  has been the subject of several documentaries, including Enquete Exclusive - Affaire Bertrand Cantat (2019) which deals with her death and subsequent trial of Cantat, and shows, for the first time on French television, images of Bertrand Cantat’s hearing before the Lithuanian court, and Marie Trintignant: Tes rêves brisés (2022), which recalls her life, being directed by her mother.

Awards
Trintignant was nominated for France's most prestigious acting honor, the César Award, five times, for her roles in:
 Comme elle respire - 1999 (best actress)
 Le Cousin - 1998 (best supporting actress)
 Le cri de la soie - 1997 (best actress)
 Les Marmottes - 1994 (best supporting actress)
 Une affaire de femmes - 1989 (best supporting actress)

Partial filmography

 Mon Amour, Mon Amour (1967)
 It Only Happens to Others (1971)
 Défense de savoir (1973) - La petite fille Marie
 Le voyage de noces (1976) - La jeune fille au marriage
 Série noire (1979) - Mona
 La terrazza (1980) - Isabella
 Premier voyage (1980) - Marie Lambert
 Un matin rouge (1982) - Marie
 Les îles (1983) - Nathalie
 Next Summer (1985) - Sidonie
 Noyade interdite (1987) - Isabelle
 La maison de Jeanne (1988) - Martine
 Story of Women (1988) - Lulu / Lucie
 Wings of Fame (1990) - Bianca
  (1990) - Emilie / Woman
 Alberto Express (1990) - Clara
 Les Amants du Pont-Neuf (1991) - (voice)
 Contre l'oubli (1991) - Herself (segment "Pour José Ramón Garciá Gómez, Mexique")
 Betty (1992) - Betty Etamble
 L'instinct de l'ange (1993) - La jeune veuve
  (1993) - Renée Dandrieux
 Les marmottes (1993) - Lucie
 Hoffman's honger (1993) - Irena Nova
 Fugueuses (1995) - Marina
 Les apprentis (1995) - Lorette
 Des nouvelles du bon Dieu (1996) - Evangile
 Le cri de la soie (1996) - Marie Benjamin
 Ponette (1996) - La mère
 Portraits chinois (1996) - Nina
 Les démons de Jésus (1997) - Levrette
 Le cousin (1997) - Juge Lambert
 White Lies (1998) - Jeanne
 Deep in the Woods (2000) - La mère
 Harrison's Flowers (2000) - Cathy
 Le prince du Pacifique (2000) - Moeata
 Una lunga lunga lunga notte d'amore (2001) - Irene
 Petites Misères (2002) - Nicole
 Total Kheops (2002) - Lole
 Corto Maltese, la cour secrète des arcanes (2002) - La Duchesse Marina Seminova (voice)
 Corto Maltese - Sous le signe du capricorne (2002) - Bouche Dorée
 Les Marins perdus (2003) - Mariette
 Janis et John (2003) - Brigitte Sterni
 Ce qu'ils imaginent (2004) - Juliette
 Colette, une femme libre (2004, TV mini-series, also writer) - Colette (final appearance)

Appearances in other media
Not long before her death, she sang a duet in the song "Pièce montée des grands jours" by French folksinger Thomas Fersen in 2003.

References

External links 
 
 

1962 births
2003 deaths
Burials at Père Lachaise Cemetery
Neurological disease deaths in France
Deaths from cerebral edema
French film actresses
Deaths by beating in Europe
People from Boulogne-Billancourt
20th-century French actresses
21st-century French actresses
People murdered in Lithuania
French murder victims
Violence against women in Lithuania
2003 crimes in Lithuania
2003 murders in Europe
2000s murders in Lithuania
Female murder victims
Domestic violence in France